The Hitachi Flora Prius was a range of personal computers marketed in Japan by Hitachi, Ltd. during the late 1990s.

The Flora Prius was preinstalled with both Microsoft Windows 98 as well as BeOS.  It did not, however, have a dual-boot option as Microsoft reminded Be of the terms of the Windows OEM license. In effect, two thirds of the hard drive was hidden from the end-user, and a series of complicated manipulations was necessary to activate the BeOS partition.

Models 

FLORA Prius 330J came in three models:
 330N40JB: Base version with no LCD Screen
 3304ST40JB: Included a 14.1-inch super TFT color LCD Display
 3304ST40JBT: Included a 14.1-inch super TFT color LCD Display and WinTV Video capture board

Base specifications 

 CPU: Pentium II processor (400 MHz)
 RAM: 64 MB SDRAM
 Hard Drive: 6.4 GB (2 GB for Windows 98 and 4.6 GB for BeOS)
 CD-ROM Drive: 24X speed max.
 100BASE-TX/10BASE-10

References

Hitachi
BeOS